Sheila Dhar (1929 – 26 July 2001) was an Indian author and singer of Kirana gharana. She is known for her writings about music and musicians, which included three books. She also taught English literature and language at Delhi University. She was the wife of P. N. Dhar, an economist and an advisor of Prime Minister Indira Gandhi.

After dropping out of Lady Hardinge Medical College, Sheila joined Hindu College and was the top of Delhi University English Honours batch in 1950. She was awarded a Summa Cum Laude for her M.A. by Boston University following which she taught Literature for a short while at Miranda House,  and then joined the Government's Publications Division.

Sheila published a book - Raga'n Josh - about the lifestyle of the Mathur Kayasthas in the Delhi of the 1940s and '50s providing a glimpse of the old Delhi, which included her experiences with life in bureaucracy and anecdotes from the lives of musicians like Bade Ghulam Ali Khan, Kesarbai Kerkar, Pran Nath, and Begum Akhtar.

Two books penned by  Sheila Dhar reveal insights into the world of Hindustani classical music and its practitioners.

Bibliography
Children's History of India (1961)
This India (1973) 
Here's Someone I'd Like You to Meet (1995)
Raga'n' Josh
Tales of Innocents, Musicians and Bureaucrats

References

External links

1929 births
2001 deaths
Indian people of Kashmiri descent
Indian women
Kashmiri people
Kashmiri Pandits
Boston University alumni
Hindustani singers
Delhi University alumni
Place of birth missing
20th-century Indian singers
Women Hindustani musicians
Indian women classical singers
20th-century Indian women singers